Eulalia Szwajkowska (12 February 1932 – 25 February 2009) was  a Polish sprinter. She competed in the women's 200 metres at the 1952 Summer Olympics.

References

External links
 

1932 births
2009 deaths
Athletes (track and field) at the 1952 Summer Olympics
Polish female sprinters
Olympic athletes of Poland
Sportspeople from Bydgoszcz
Zawisza Bydgoszcz athletes
Olympic female sprinters